Black Prince or The Black Prince may refer to:

Personal nicknames
 Edward, the Black Prince, English prince in the Middle Ages
 Naresuan, King of Siam
 Junio Valerio Borghese, Fascist Italian noble and military leader
 Kostas Davourlis, Greek footballer
 Robby Robinson (bodybuilder)
 Peter Jackson (boxer), 19th century bare-knuckle boxer
 Prince Lee Boo, Palauan prince
 Radu Negru, a legendary Romanian ruler also known as Negru Vodă (“Black Prince”)
 Charles Haughey, former Taoiseach of Ireland was known as "The Black Prince of Irish politics"

In the military
 , various ships of the Royal Navy
 , a class of 4 sailing ships of the Royal Navy
 The British merchantman Black Prince, converted to the man-of-war  
 Black Prince (tank), a development of the Churchill tank

Vehicles
 Black Prince, a GWR 3031 Class Great Western Railway locomotive between 1891 and 1915
 Black Prince, a Standard Class 9F steam locomotive built for British Rail in 1959, named after preservation in 1967
 Black Prince, a Standard Class 7 steam locomotive built for British Railways in April 1951
 Black Prince (rocket), British proposed civilian rocket
 Black Prince (ship), Fred. Olsen Cruise Lines ship
 Black Prince (car), British cyclecar made only in 1920
 Black Prince, car made in small numbers by Invicta between 1946 and 1950
 Vincent Black Prince, British motorcycle

In entertainment
 The Black Prince (play), English Restoration era historical tragedy
 Edward the Black Prince (play) 1750 play by William Shirley
 The Dark Avenger (1955 film), where Errol Flynn plays Edward, the Black Prince
 The Black Prince (novel), by Iris Murdoch
 The Black Prince (film), a 2017 film
 Alias of Lelouch Lamperouge, a character in the anime Code Geass
 "Black Prince" (Schwarzer Prinz), a song in the musical Elisabeth

Other uses
 Black Prince Mountain, in Canada 
 Mount Black Prince (disambiguation), two mountains, one in Canada, the other in Antarctica
 Psaltoda plaga, Australian species of cicada
 Rohana parisatis, Asian species of butterfly
 Cinsaut, a red wine grape also known as Black Prince
 Trollinger, a German/Italian wine grape that is also known as Black Prince
 Black Prince, a common cultivar of heirloom tomato
 Black Prince Buses, a former bus operating company in England
 Black Prince, Bexley, a hotel and former live music venue in the London Borough of Bexley
 De Swarte Prinsch, Tytsjerk, a windmill in Tytsjerk, Friesland, the Netherlands

See also
 Alphonse Gangitano, Italian-Australian gangster nicknamed the "Black Prince of Lygon Street"
 Maharaja Dalip Singh, nicknamed "Black Prince of Perthshire" during his exile in Britain
Alessandro de' Medici, Duke of Florence, 16th-century Italian noble, sometimes called "The Moor " or "The Black Prince"
The Black Prince, an account of the life of John Naimbanna, a prince of the Temne people from Sierra Leone